This article refers to crime in the U.S. state of Tennessee.

State statistics
In 2010, 356 people were murdered in Tennessee. In 2009 and 2010, Tennessee had the highest rate of violent gun crime of any US state. In 2010, only Washington, D.C., had a higher rate of gun violence. Tennessee came out highest in the nation in the rate at which its residents are victims of aggravated assaults with a firearm and fifth-worst in robberies.

In 2008 there were 296,565 crimes reported in the state of Tennessee, including 412 murders. In 2014 there were 240,295 crimes reported, including 371 murders.

By location

Memphis 

In 2006, the Memphis metropolitan area ranked number one in violent crimes for major cities around the U.S according to the FBI's annual crime rankings. In 2001, 2005, 2006 and 2007, the Memphis metropolitan area ranked second most dangerous in the nation among cities with a population over 500,000.  It also ranked as most dangerous in 2002.

Jackson 
According to Morgan Quitno's 2010 Metropolitan Crime Rate Rankings  the Jackson metropolitan area had the 13th highest crime rate in the United States. Jackson is the primary city within the wider Jackson metropolitan area.

The Morgan Quitno list of the "Top 25 Most Dangerous Cities of 2007", ranked Jackson's as the 9th most dangerous metropolitan area in the United States. In 2006, it had been listed as the 18th most dangerous.

Policing 

In 2008, Tennessee had 375 state and local law enforcement agencies. Those agencies employed a total of 25,697 staff. Of the total staff, 15,976 were sworn officers (defined as those with general arrest powers).

Police ratio 

In 2008, Tennessee had 256 police officers per 100,000 residents.

Capital punishment laws

Capital punishment is applied in this state, but is rarely employed, with last execution in 2019.

References